CapeTalk is a commercial AM radio station based in Cape Town, South Africa, broadcasting on AM/MW 567 to Cape Town. The station is also webcast via its website. It claims to be Cape Town's number one news and talk station, offering news, sport, business and actuality programming, with a high proportion of its airtime filled with phone-in debates. It was established in 1997. The station is owned by Primedia.

CapeTalk's sister station is 702, a Johannesburg based FM radio station.

History
The station first broadcast at 06h00 on Tuesday, 14 October 1997 by John Maytham from their offices on Bree Street.  From the start the station sought to position its self to provide an independent forum for Capetonians to swap ideas and voice opinions. Former presenters include the former Sunday Times columnist Jani Allan between 1997 and 2000.

Current studios
The studios are now located at Suite 7d, Somerset Square, Highfield Road, Greenpoint, Cape Town. The station relocated in 2006 after its sister station KFM became a subsidiary of Primedia (PTY) Ltd. and bigger premises were needed to house both stations in one building.

Presenters 

There are a range of presenters on Cape Talk (and on 702) that host various shows. The Cape-based presenters include: 
 Sara-Jayne King
 Pippa Hudson
 Africa Melane
 John Maytham
 Stephen Grootes
 Kieno Kammies
 Marc Lewis

Broadcast time
24/7

Listenership figures

See also
702 Talk Radio
Primedia

References

External links
CapeTalk Official website
SAARF Website
Sentech Website
CapeTalk on Instagram

Radio stations in Cape Town
1997 establishments in South Africa
Radio stations established in 1997
News and talk radio stations